The 2021 Magyar Kupa Final was the final match of the 2020–21 Magyar Kupa, played between Fehérvár and Újpest on 3 May 2021 at the Puskás Aréna in Budapest, Hungary.

Route to the final

Key: (H) = Home; (A) = Away

Match

References

External links
 Official site 

2021
Fehérvár FC matches
Újpest FC matches